Laurel Springs may refer to:

Laurel Springs, New Jersey
Laurel Springs School District
Laurel Springs, North Carolina

See also
Laurel Springs Ranch, California
Laurel Springs School, California